is a railway station located in Fushimi-ku, Kyoto, Kyoto Prefecture, Japan, on the Keihan Electric Railway Keihan Main Line.

Layout
This station has 2 side platforms with a track each.

Surroundings
Fushimi Inari-taisha
Inari Station (JR West Nara Line)

Adjacent stations

References

See also
Inari Station (JR) 

Railway stations in Japan opened in 1910
Railway stations in Kyoto